Nordic Brazilians refers to Brazilians of full or partial Nordic ancestry, or Nordic-born people residing in Brazil.

The Nordic settlement in Brazil began in the mid to late 19th century and was predominant when around 3,640 Nordic peoples arrived in Brazil, mainly from Sweden. Many Nordic people came to Brazil for economic reasons and to start a new life.

In recent years, a few Norwegians and Swedes have migrated to the littoral zone of the State of Rio Grande do Norte (mainly Natal) and Ceará, attracted by the beaches and the tropical climate.

History
Daniel Solander became the first Swedish person to ever visit Brazil when he came to the country in 1768.

Mass emigration from Norway started circa 1865–1866, after the civil war was over. Several ship-owners saw the opportunity to earn good money by transporting migrants to the New World. United States, Canada and Brazil received many Norwegians.

In Curitiba, one of the first Scandinavians of note to arrive was Alfredo Andersen, an artist who arrived towards the end of the 19th century and painted well into the 1930s. The Museu Alfredo Andersen contains much of his work, located in Paraná (state). In addition, Icelandic immigrants settled there in 1863 and again in 1873.

Probably the largest concentration of Swedish immigrants in Brazil is located in the area of Missões in the southern state of Rio Grande do Sul, where in the late 1800s 200 Swedish families moved to the city of Guarani das Missões.
 
Examples of this immigration are the Karlson House (Casa Sueca) in Guarani das Missões, the Svenska Kulturhuset in the district of Linha Jansen (Farroupilha, RS), the Mission of  Örebro in Venancio Aires, RS. Swedish cultural groups include the Ovenska Danser ballet of Ijuí, RS and the Ballet Patrícia Johnson of Bento Gonçalves, RS.

In April 2010, the City of Nova Roma, RS celebrated the 120th anniversary of the Swedish immigration to the city. Earlier, in 1991, the city of Ijui, RS celebrated the immigration of the Scandinavians to their city (mainly Swedes) with the opening of a Swedish Cultural Center in the city.

There was also significant immigration of Swedish and Danish citizens to São João da Boa Vista, in the state of São Paulo.

In the 1920s, Danish immigrants in rural parts of Aiuruoca laid the foundation for the modern Brazilian cheese production.

Religion and culture
The Scandinavian Church in Brazil is a part of The Swedish Church Abroad (SKUT) – which belongs to the Church of Sweden. They offer services for Scandinavians or persons with Scandinavian related interests. They have churches in Rio de Janeiro and São Paulo.

The Norwegian Church Abroad or The Norwegian Seamen's Church is located in Rio de Janeiro. The Norwegian Church Abroad or The Norwegian Seamen's Church (Norwegian: Sjømannskirken) is a religious organisation serving Norwegians and other Scandinavians travelling abroad. Founded in 1864, The Norwegian Seamen's Mission – Sjømannsmisjonen – was established to secure the moral and religious education of Scandinavian seafarers, but also to give them "breathing room" where a fellow countryman was available to lend an ear and give some attention. Today, the churches and their staff together with travelling pastors around the globe represent a "resource center" for all Norwegians travelling internationally.

Also, over time, many of the Scandinavians have converted to Roman Catholicism, or more recently, other forms of Protestantism.

Notable Nordic Brazilians

 Peter Wilhelm Lund, palaeontologist and zoologist
 Erling Lorentzen, industrialist
 Robert Scheidt, professional sailor
 Bob Burnquist, professional skateboarder
 Rinaldo de Lamare, pediatric physician
 Torben Grael, professional sailor
 Lars Grael, politician and former professional sailor
 Erik Bagger, goldsmith
 Augusto Bruno Nielson and Eugênio Nielson, founders of the "Nielson Bus" bodies in Brazil (Busscar)
 , religious leader
 Amyr Klink, explorer and sailor
 Lars Sigurd Björkström, professional sailor
 Manuel Bergström Lourenço Filho, educator
 Monique Olsen, fashion model
 Princess Ragnhild of Norway
 Peter Dolving, musician and songwriter
 Jonathan Haagensen, actor and model
 Phellipe Haagensen, actor

See also
 Brazil–Denmark relations
 Brazil–Finland relations
 Brazil–Norway relations
 Brazil–Sweden relations
 Immigration to Brazil
 Danish diaspora
 Norwegian diaspora
 Swedish diaspora
 White Brazilians

References

European Brazilian
Brazil
Brazilian
Brazilian
Finnish diaspora